Bangladesh Journals OnLine (BanglaJOL) is a project started by the International Network for the Availability of Scientific Publications (INASP) funded by the Department of International Development of the British Government to encourage open access of information.

History 
INASP initiated BanglaJOL in June 2007 and officially launched it in September 2007. The Bangladesh Academy of Sciences assumed management of BanglaJOL in 2014.

It is a database of open access journals published in Bangladesh, dealing with the full range of academic disciplines including both paper based and online only publications. Aim of the project is to make participating peer-reviewed journals' high visibility, high readership and open access over the internet by providing access to tables of contents (ToCs), abstracts and full-text.

See also
Open Journal Systems
African Journals OnLine

References

External links

Organizations established in 2007
Open-access archives
Academic journal online publishing platforms
Full-text scholarly online databases
Open access projects